Akkulevo (Aqkül) is a rural locality (a village) in Orlovsky Selsoviet, Arkhangelsky District, Bashkortostan, Russia. The population was 5 as of 2010. There is 50 streets.

Geography 
Akkulevo is located 21 km southwest of Arkhangelskoye (the district's administrative centre) by road. Orlovka is the nearest rural locality.

References 

Rural localities in Arkhangelsky District